Kieran Bennett (born 21 November 1994) is an Irish hurler who plays for the Waterford senior team.
Bennett made his championship debut for Waterford on 13 August 2017 in the 2017 All-Ireland semi-final win against Cork.	

His younger brothers, Stephen and Shane Bennett also play with Waterford.

Honours

Player

Ballysaggart
Munster Junior Club Hurling Championship (1): 2013
Waterford Junior Hurling Championship (1): 2013

References

1994 births
Living people
Ballysaggart hurlers
Waterford inter-county hurlers